The Anglo-Manipur War was an armed conflict between the British Empire and the Kingdom of Manipur. The war lasted between 31 March and 27 April 1891 and ended in a British victory.

Background
In the First Anglo-Burmese War, the British helped prince Gambhir Singh regain his kingdom of Manipur, which had been heretofore occupied by the Burmese. Subsequently, Manipur became a British protectorate. From 1835, the British stationed a Political Agent in Manipur.

In 1890, the reigning Maharaja was Surachandra Singh. His brother Kulachandra Singh was the jubraj (heir apparent) and another brother Tikendrajit Singh was the military commander (senapati). Frank Grimwood was the British Political Agent.

Tikendrajit is said to have been the most able of the three brothers, and was also friendly with the Political Agent. According to historian Katherine Prior, the British influence depended on the military aid they had provided to the ruling family, which had dried up in the 1880s, leading Tikendrajit to doubt the value of British alliance.

Historian Jangkhomang Guite states the British annexation of Upper Burma reduced the strategic importance of Manipur. They contemplated introducing reforms in the administration of Manipur but, according to Guite,  Tikendrajit stood in their way.

Causes 

According to historian Jangkhomang Guite, on the British government part with the annexation of Upper Burma in 1855 the importance of Manipur kingdom as a " frontier kingdom " ended and it was followed by gradual decrease in military aids to Manipur.

As far as back in 1855, the Chief Commissioner of Assam asked the government of British India for its opinion for reforms in Manipur administration. He stated the Political agent of British Government in Manipur exercised very little interference in internal matters of Manipur and he wanted to change this. He particularly recommended the abolition of slavery system prevailed in Manipur, reform in trade system , a system of passes and the administration of jails and law courts with immediate effect. The Viceroy replied  The GoI in general, felt that it would not be justified to carry out any sweeping reforms in the 'Native States in India' but set the 'exceptional' case for Manipur. It recommended that the reform being advocated 'may be possible and expedient' as Manipur was 'not a State in India' . 

And cautioned not to proceed too fast and advised considering opinion of local officers and then submitting an official representation so that the attentive consideration of Government of India could be taken up.

The previous free supply of arms, ammunition and other aids to Manipur had been gradually removed. This led to reduction of Manipuri troops and a report against the state of administration increased.The political agents escorts had been increased double fold. Since 1855 an Indian regiment was stationed at Langthabal which were responsible for suppressing internal rebellion in Manipur, this was later minimized to two companies only. Maharajah Surchandra influenced declined making him unpopular among his subjects. It was in this time Senapati Tikendrajit emerged as a promising leader in Manipur.While being so popular among the people of Manipur, Tikendrajit did everything to stop British influence in Manipur's affairs.

This displeased the British so much which made him  seen as a threat to British influence in Manipur. Every possible means was taken up by British to remove him from Manipur. He was initially accused of taking the administration of Manipur State in his own hands making the king a mere puppet, this was considered in a way as a war against Queen Empress of India under colonial law. Next he was accused of brutally torturing Manipur people. The Viceroy even remarked Tikendrajit as 'notorious'. In 1888, Maharajah Sur Chandra was advised to remove Tikendrajit from Manipur, which was declined though and no one can know for sure what prompted the Maharajah to go to British Residency and what exactly was conspired between the political agent and him. In September he signed an abdication letter and immediately went to British territory to collude with the British for restoration of his power (king's power).

Coup and rebellion 

On 21 September 1890, Tikendrajit Singh led a palace coup, ousting Maharaja Surachandra Singh and installing Kulachandra Singh as the ruler. He also pronounced himself as the new jubraj. Surachandra Singh took refuge in British residency, where Grimwood assisted him to flee the state. The Maharaja had given the impression that he was abdicating the throne but, after reaching the British territory in the neighbouring Assam Province, he recanted and wanted return to the state. Both the Political Agent and the Chief Commissioner of Assam, James Wallace Quinton, dissuaded from returning.

Surachandra Singh reached Calcutta and appealed to the Government of India, reminding the British of the services he had rendered. On 24 January 1891, the Governor-General instructed the Chief Commissioner of Assam to settle the matter by going to Manipur:

The Chief Commissioner Quinton persuaded the Government in Calcutta that there would be no use trying to reinstate the Maharaja. This was agreed, but the Government wanted the Senapati Tikendrajit Singh disciplined.

Quinton arrived in Manipur on 22 March 1891, with an escort of 400 Gurkhas under the command of Colonel Skene. The plan was to hold a Darbar in the residency with the erstwhile jubraj Kulachandra Singh (now regarded as the Regent) attending along with all the nobles, where a demand would be made to surrender the senapati. The Regent came to attend the Darbar, but the senapati did not. Another attempt was made the next day which was also unsuccessful. Quinton ordered the arrest of senapati in his own fort, which was evidently repulsed and the residency itself was besieged. Finally Quinton went on to negotiate with Tikendrajit, accompanied by Grimwood, Skene and other British officers. The talks failed and while returning, the British party was attacked by an "angry crowd". Grimwood was speared to death. The others escaped to the fort. But during the night the crowd led them out and executed them, Quinton included.

According to later accounts, Quinton had proposed to Kulachandra Singh a cessation of all hostilities and his return to Kohima (in Naga Hills to the north of Manipur). Kulachandra and Tikendrajit regarded the proposals as deception.

The surviving British troops besieged in the residency were led out by two junior officers in the dead of night, along with Frank Grimwood's wife Ethel Grimwood. It was a disorganised retreat. But they were met in the forests by a relief party arriving from Cachar and were rescued. The Residency was set on fire soon after their departure.

On 27 March 1891, news of the executions reached the British. Colonel Charles James William Grant took the initiative organising a punitive expedition consisting of 50 soldiers of the 12th (Burma) Madras Infantry and 35 members of the 43rd Gurkha Regiment, Grant's column left Tamu, Burma the following day.

The only woman in the retreat from the residency was Ethel Grimwood, who was later lionised as a heroine of the "Manipur Disaster" when she returned to Britain. She received a medal, £1,000, a civil list pension and she wrote her biography. It is unclear now as to her contribution, but a hero was required and Ethel became that hero.

War

On 31 March 1891, British India declared war on Kangleipak, expeditionary forces were assembled in Kohima and Silchar. On the same day, the Tamu column seized the village of Thoubal after ousting an 800-man Manipuri garrison. On 1 April, 2,000 Manipuri soldiers accompanied by two guns laid siege to the village, Grant's troops repelled numerous attacks during the course of nine days. On 9 April, the Tamu column retreated from Thoubal in order to join the other columns, after being reinforced by 100 rifles of the 12th (Burma) Madras Infantry. Manipur forces suffered heavy casualties during the engagement while the British lost one soldier dead and four wounded.

The Kohima column was launched on 20 April, encountering no resistance apart from coming under rifle fire four days later. On 21 April, the Silchar column reached Thoubal, the next day the Tamu column clashed with Manipur troops outside Palel, after the latter pursued the British troops, the Meitei were once more pushed back.On 23 April, Meitei troops  led by Poila Meiraba met the British troops at Kakching where Meiraba was killed in action along with 20 soldiers.

On 23 April, British scouts encountered 700 Manipuri soldiers on the Khongjom hillock in the vicinity of Palel.This battle is popularly known as Khongjom Battle being the last battle of Anglo Manipur War. 350 infantrymen, 44 cavalry and 2 guns mounted an assault on the remainder of the Manipur army. Hand-to-hand fighting ensued, 2 British soldiers were killed and 11 were severely injured, while the Manipuri lost over 128 men including the death of high ranking officials  such as Major Paona Brajabasi, Heirang Kongja and Chinglensana.

On 27 April 1891, the Silchar, Tamu and Kohima columns united, capturing Imphal after finding it deserted. The Union Jack was hoisted above the Kangla Palace, 62 native loyalists were freed by the British troops. On 23 May 1891, Tikendrajit Singh was detained by British authorities On 13 August 1891, five Manipuri commanders including Tikendrajit were hanged for waging war against the British Empire, Kulachandra Singh along with 21 Manipuri noblemen, who received sentences of property forfeiture and transportation for life. Manipur underwent a disarmament campaign, 4,000 firearms were confiscated from the local population.

On 22 September 1891, the British placed the young boy Meidingngu Churachand on the throne.

Legacy

Ethel Grimwood was given £1,000, a pension and the Royal Red Cross (despite having no links to nursing). British participants of the Manipuri expedition received the North East Frontier clasp for the India General Service Medal. Colonel Charles James William Grant also received the Victoria Cross, for his actions during the battle of Thoubal. The medal received by Colonel Charles James William Grant was auctioned on 24 June 2021 along with other collections of historical importance for an estimated sum of £420,000.

13 August is commemorated yearly as "Patriots Day" in Manipur, with remarks to honour the Manipuri soldiers that lost their lives during the war. Tikendrajit Singh's portrait is included in the National Portrait Gallery inside the House of the People in New Delhi. 23 April is also observed as the "Khongjom Day", marking the occasion of the battle of Khongjom.

See also
British expedition to Tibet
 Khongjom War Memorial Complex
Insurgency in Manipur
Pakhangba
Sikkim Expedition

Notes

References

Bibliography
 Ahmad, Maj Rifat Nadeem, and Ahmed, Maj Gen Rafiuddin. (2006). Unfaded Glory: The 8th Punjab Regiment 1798–1956. Abbottabad: The Baloch Regimental Centre.

Further reading
Majumdar, R. C. (1960). 

Conflicts in 1891
19th-century conflicts
Military history of British India
History of Manipur
Wars involving Great Britain
19th century in India
Resistance to the British Empire